KFMU-FM (104.1 FM) is a radio station broadcasting an Adult Album Alternative (AAA) music format. Licensed to Oak Creek, Colorado, United States, the station is currently owned by Patricia MacDonald Garber and Peter Benedetti, through licensee AlwaysMountainTime, LLC, Eli "The Prize Guy" Campbell is on the air weekdays 6a-12n, Kasey Lane is on weekdays 12pm-6pm and KFMU airs the Putumayo World Music Hour, Acoustic Cafe and Elwood's Bluesmobile every weekend.

References

External links

FMU-FM